Freakish is a something extraordinary in appearance or behaviour.

Freakish may refer to:

 Freakish (TV series), an American television horror series
 Freakish (Anthony Coleman album), 2009
 Freakish (Joe Gideon & the Shark album), 2013